Pterocerina psidii is a species of ulidiid or picture-winged fly in the genus Pterocerina of the family Ulidiidae.

References

psidii
Insects described in 1954